Guru Sishyan may refer to:

 Guru Sishyan (1988 film), a 1988 Tamil film
 Guru Sishyan (2010 film), a 2010 Tamil film